Game ng Bayan (abbreviated as GNB, lit. Game of the Nation) was a short-lived Philippine game show hosted by Robin Padilla and Alex Gonzaga, with Eric Nicolas, Mary Jean Lastimosa and Negi. It premiered on ABS-CBN and worldwide on The Filipino Channel, replacing Kapamilya, Deal or No Deal. It aired weekday afternoons at 5:00-5:45pm (timeslot may vary in some areas nationwide). This was the fourth localized Kapamilya game show after Pilipinas, Game KNB?, Panahon Ko 'to!: Ang Game Show ng Buhay Ko and Celebrity Playtime.

Each of the game show's episode is held in a different barangay where contestants are usually residents of the selected locality.

Game ng Bayan was debuted on March 7, 2016 as part of the Kapamilya Gold afternoon block, and aired around the same time as GMA Network's Wowowin. The program cancelled with its last episode on April 15, 2016. Following the end of the game show's run, Robin Padilla focused on his commitment on the fifth season of Pilipinas Got Talent, while the rest of his co-castmates got other projects. The show, along with the Korean drama My Love Donna, were both replaced by My Super D.

Hosts

Main hosts
 Robin Padilla
 Alex Gonzaga
 Eric Nicolas
 Mary Jean Lastimosa
 Negi

Guest co-host
 Angelica Panganiban (substitute host for Gonzaga)

Game Segments
 Koloreta
 Ang Dami Mong Alam
 Buksan Ang Plato
 Storya ng Buhay
 Barangay Games
 Barangay Ultimate Showdown (Friday)

Competition
Because of its timeslot, Game ng Bayan faced its first and last rival show, GMA Network's Wowowin. Despite the all-star cast, they failed to topple their rival show. This is the reason why Game ng Bayan was axed after a month since its debut.

Ratings

References

See also
List of programs broadcast by ABS-CBN

ABS-CBN original programming
Philippine game shows
2016 Philippine television series debuts
2016 Philippine television series endings
Filipino-language television shows